= Mecothrix omphalota =

Scientific classification
- Kingdom: Animalia
- Phylum: Arthropoda
- Clade: Pancrustacea
- Class: Insecta
- Order: Lepidoptera
- Superfamily: Noctuoidea
- Family: Nolidae
- Genus: Mecothrix
- Species: M. omphalota

Binomial name
- Mecothrix omphalota (Hampson, 1903)

Synonyms
- Celama omphalota Hampson, 1903

Species of moth

Mecothrix omphalota is a species of moth in the family Nolidae. It was described by Sir George Francis Hampson, 10th Baronet in 1903. This species can be found in West Africa and central Africa.

== Description ==
The male lectotype of this species is from Nigeria.
